Ethan Walker (born 28 July 2002) is an English professional footballer who plays for Blackburn Rovers.

Club career

Preston North End

Walker signed his first professional contract in October 2018 and in December 2018, he became the youngest player to appear in a league game for Preston North End when he came on a substitute in a 1–1 draw against Aston Villa at the age of 16 years and 156 days.

On 12 December 2019, Walker joined Altrincham F.C. on loan for the rest of the 2019–20 season. He was still available to play for Preston's youth team's during his loan spell at Altrincham. However, he was recalled on 14 January 2020 and later on the same month, he joined Stalybridge Celtic on loan instead, until the end of the season along with fellow Preston teammate Adam O'Reilly.

On 12 September 2020, Walker joined League Two Carlisle United on a season-long loan. After appearing in four league games for the Cumbrians, Walker was recalled by his parent club Preston North End on 8 January 2021.

In September 2021, he joined National League North side AFC Fylde on loan for a month. He returned to Preston after only two games due to injury, but re-joined the Coasters in November until January 2022. Walker was released at the end of the 2021–22 season.

Blackburn Rovers

On 30 May 2022, it was announced that Walker had signed for Blackburn Rovers on a two-year deal.

Career statistics

References

2002 births
Living people
English footballers
Association football forwards
Preston North End F.C. players
Altrincham F.C. players
Stalybridge Celtic F.C. players
Carlisle United F.C. players
AFC Fylde players
English Football League players
National League (English football) players
Northern Premier League players